The least honeyguide (Indicator exilis) is a species of bird in the family Indicatoridae.
It is found in sub-Saharan Africa from Guinea-Bissau to South Sudan and southwards to Angola and Zambia.

References

least honeyguide
Birds of the Gulf of Guinea
Birds of Sub-Saharan Africa
least honeyguide
Taxonomy articles created by Polbot